The Department for Enterprise (Rheynn Gastid Dellal) is one of eight departments of the Isle of Man Government. It was created on 1 April 2010 as the Department for Economic Development, largely replacing the former Department of Trade and Industry as well as taking on the tourism function from the former Department of Tourism and Leisure and several other functions from the Isle of Man Treasury and the former Department of Education.

The department was renamed as the Department for Enterprise in November 2017 under Statutory Document No. 2017/0325.

The current (in 2022) Minister for Enterprise is Tim Johnston MHK.

Functions
Executive Agencies
Finance Isle of Man
Visit Isle of Man
Digital Isle of Man
Business Isle of Man

Registries
Isle of Man Central Registry
Isle of Man Aircraft Registry
Isle of Man Ship Registry

Strategy & Policy
Locate Isle of Man
Economic Development
Work Permits

Non Governmental Agencies reporting to the Department
Isle of Man Post Office

Ministers for Enterprise
Tim Johnston MHK, February 2023 - present
Lawrie Hooper MHK, September 2022 - February 2023
Alfred Cannan MHK, May 2022 - September 2022
Alex Allinson MHK, Oct 2021 – May 2022
Laurence Skelly MHK, 2017-2021

Ministers for Economic Development
Laurence Skelly MHK, 2014–17
John Shimmin MHK, 2011–14
Allan Bell MHK, 2010–11

External links
 Department for Enterprise - Isle of Man Government
 Locate Isle of Man (relocation)
 Visit Isle of Man
 Finance Isle of Man
 Digital Isle of Man
 Business Isle of Man

Government of the Isle of Man